This list is of the Places of Scenic Beauty of Japan located within the Prefecture of Iwate.

National Places of Scenic Beauty
As of 1 July 2020, eleven Places have been designated at a national level (including one *Special Place of Scenic Beauty); Landscape of Oku no Hosomichi is a serial designation spanning ten prefectures.

Prefectural Places of Scenic Beauty
As of 1 May 2019, two Places have been designated at a prefectural level.

Municipal Places of Scenic Beauty
As of 1 May 2019, eight Places have been designated at a municipal level.

Registered Places of Scenic Beauty
As of 1 July 2020, three Monuments have been registered (as opposed to designated) as Places of Scenic Beauty at a national level.

See also
 Cultural Properties of Japan
 List of Historic Sites of Japan (Iwate)
 List of parks and gardens of Iwate Prefecture
 List of Cultural Properties of Japan - paintings (Iwate)

References

External links
  Cultural Properties of Iwate Prefecture

Tourist attractions in Iwate Prefecture
Places of Scenic Beauty